The Shire of Wongan–Ballidu is a local government area in the Wheatbelt region of Western Australia, about  NNE of Perth, the state capital. The shire includes the Wongan Hills, after which the town is named.

History
On 10 February 1887, the Melbourne Road District was created. It was renamed the Wongan-Ballidu Road District on 18 June 1926. On 1 July 1961, it became a shire following the passage of the Local Government Act 1960, which reformed all remaining road districts into shires.

Wards
As of 3 May 2003, there are ten councillors and no wards. The mayor is directly elected.

Towns and localities
The towns and localities of the Shire of X with population and size figures based on the most recent Australian census:

Former towns
 Kokardine

Population

Heritage-listed places

As of 2023, 183 places are heritage-listed in the Shire of Wongan–Ballidu, of which five are on the State Register of Heritage Places.

References

External links

 

Wongan